Cristo Díaz Martín (born 20 June 1992) is a Spanish footballer as a central midfielder for Club Atlético Tacoronte.

Club career
Born in El Sauzal, Santa Cruz de Tenerife, Canary Islands, Díaz graduated from CD Vera's youth setup, after starting it out at neighbouring CD Puerto Cruz. He made his debuts as a senior in the 2010–11 campaign, in Tercera División.

In the 2012 summer Díaz moved to CD Tenerife, being assigned to the reserves also in the fourth level. In August 2013 he was loaned to CA Victoria, in the same division.

On 22 November 2014 Díaz played his first match as a professional, replacing Ricardo León in the 56th minute of a 0–0 home draw against RCD Mallorca in the Segunda División championship. On 28 July of the following year he was loaned to Algeciras CF in Segunda División B.

On 24 January 2019, Díaz joined Club Atlético Tacoronte.

References

External links

Cristo Díaz at La Preferente

1992 births
Living people
People from Tenerife
Sportspeople from the Province of Santa Cruz de Tenerife
Spanish footballers
Footballers from the Canary Islands
Association football midfielders
Segunda División players
Segunda División B players
Tercera División players
CD Tenerife B players
CD Tenerife players
Algeciras CF footballers
CD Izarra footballers